Craig Alan Puki (born January 18, 1957) is a former American football linebacker who played two seasons in the National Football League (NFL) with the San Francisco 49ers and St. Louis Cardinals He was drafted by the 49ers in the third round of the 1980 NFL Draft. He played college football at the University of Tennessee and attended Glacier High School in Seattle. He was a member of the San Francisco 49ers team that won Super Bowl XVI.

References

External links
Just Sports Stats
College Stats
Fanbase profile

Players of American football from South Dakota
American football linebackers
Tennessee Volunteers football players
San Francisco 49ers players
St. Louis Cardinals (football) players
People from Deadwood, South Dakota
Living people
1957 births